Polish-Czech War can refer to:
one of several medieval Polish-Bohemian Wars
Polish–Czechoslovak War of 1919